Michael Raymond Palagyi (July 4, 1917 – November 21, 2013) was an American Major League Baseball pitcher who pitched for the Washington Senators. He is in a group of nearly 1,500 players who have appeared in exactly one Major League game. At the time of his death, he was the oldest of those one-game players.

Early life
Palagyi was one of ten children born to Joseph and Anna Palagyi. His seven brothers were Jim (Jenny), John, George (Hazel), Lewis (Pauline), Andrew (Margret), Peter (Jane), and Joseph (Pauline).  Mike's sisters included Anna Yusko, Ethel (Frank) Vento, and Helen who died at birth and twin to brother Andrew. Mike was not the only member to play professional baseball in the family. His brother George Palagyi played minor league ball for the Cleveland Indians as a pitcher. Mike would later go on to marry his wife Margaret. They had one child Michael, who died in a plane crash in the 1970s. Mike was a devote catholic and belonged to Corpus Christi Parish in Conneaut. He attended mass regularly at St. Mary Church and was buried out of St. Frances Cabrini Church. At his time of death he was the only male still alive out of the original seven brothers. Mike's youngest sister Ethel was the only Palagyi sibling left when she died in 2014. Mike was also surrounded by his nephews David Wassie, Raymond Palagyi, nieces Carol Palmer, Nancy Dworning, Mary Joan Wassie, Jennifer Palagyi great nieces Laura Dworning and great nephew Anthony Dworning and caretaker Carol Harris at the time of death.

Career
Standing  and weighing , Palagyi made his major league pitching debut August 18,  for the Washington Senators as a relief pitcher in a game against the Boston Red Sox. Coming in to the game to start the top of the ninth, with the Red Sox ahead 3-1, he began by walking Doc Cramer. Then Palagyi faced three future Hall of Fame members: Jimmie Foxx, Ted Williams and Joe Cronin.  He hit Foxx with a pitch and walked Williams and Cronin.   The walk to Cronin forced Cramer across the plate; Palagyi was lifted from the game at this point. Two other runners allowed by Palagyi would also score, and the Senators would lose the game by a final score of 6-2, but Palagyi did not receive the loss in that game. He would never play in another major league game. In an interview for Richard Tellis' book, Once Around the Bases, Palagyi said that he "threw but 2 strikes out of 15 pitches — a very short big league career".

After leaving baseball, Palagyi served during World War II. Palagyi lived in Conneaut until his death in 2013.

Distinctions
Since Palagyi allowed three earned runs without retiring a batter, his career earned run average (ERA) is infinite. He is one of at least 19 pitchers with an infinite ERA.

Palagyi and Mark Wagner are the only major-league players born in Conneaut. Both players pitched in exactly one game in relief. Wagner, however, appeared in other games as a shortstop.

References

External links

Washington Senators (1901–1960) players
Major League Baseball pitchers
Baseball players from Ohio
People from Conneaut, Ohio
1917 births
2013 deaths
Greenville Spinners players
Monessen Indians players
Montgomery Rebels players
Spartanburg Spartans players
Springfield Indians (baseball) players
Springfield Nationals players
Zanesville Greys players